Gary E. Jacobs (born 1957) is an American businessman, founder of the Gary and Jerri-Ann Jacobs High Tech High Charter School, and owner of the Lake Elsinore Storm. He is the father of U.S. Representative Sara Jacobs.

Biography
Jacobs was born to a Jewish family, the son of Joan (née Klein) and Irwin M. Jacobs. His father was co-founder of Linkabit and Qualcomm. He has three brothers: Jeffrey A. Jacobs (born 1966), Paul E. Jacobs (born 1962), and Hal Jacobs (born 1960). In 1979, Jacobs earned a B.A. in Management Science from the University of California, San Diego. After college, he worked for his father's companies, first Linkabit and then Qualcomm starting out as a programmer, then as a software engineer, and in 1996, as a senior educational specialist working with schools to improve their math and science studies. He left Qualcomm in 2000 to focus on philanthropy.

Jacobs is the majority owner of the Class Advanced A, San Diego Padres affiliate, the Lake Elsinore Storm.

Philanthropy
Jacobs served as president of the United Jewish Federation of San Diego County and served on the board of directors of Congregation Beth El in La Jolla. He is the founder of the Gary and Jerri-Ann Jacobs International Teen Leadership Institute. In 1999, he and his wife founded the Gary and Jerri-Ann Jacobs High Tech High Charter School.

Personal life
In 1983, he married Jerri-Ann Jacobs who is also Jewish; they have four children – Adam, Sara, Beth and Dylan. They currently reside in Del Mar, San Diego, California.

References

1958 births
Living people
University of California, San Diego alumni
Jewish American sportspeople
Jewish American philanthropists
Jacobs family (telecom)
21st-century American Jews